Mint Jams is the seventh album and the second live album by Japanese jazz-fusion band Casiopea, released on May 21, 1982. The album's title is an arrangement of the band members' first and last initials.

Description 

Live sound recordings from a two-day performance at Tokyo Kaikan were used, and subsequently remixed at Alfa Studio 'A' by Shunsuke Miyazami, Satoshi Nakao, Norio Yoshizawa and Atsushi Saito. The songs were specifically re-arranged with the studio work in mind, and no dubbing was performed in the studio for segments such as the outro to 'Time Limit'. To achieve the likeness of a studio quality sound, the audience noise from the Chuo Kaikan live performances were cut from the mix, except for during the bass guitar and drum solos in 'Domino Line', and the rag-time piano breakdown in 'Swear'.

Besides the title of the album being an arrangement of the band members' first and last initials, it derives the word 'mint' to imply 'a mint condition' and 'high performance'. The word 'jams' describe their live performance of which the source material was taken from.

Mint Jams was originally planned to be a compilation album with "best-of" Casiopea songs

This album is widely considered to be Casiopea's best, as it combines their live dynamism and precision with careful studio work.

Mint Jams was also Casiopea's first album to mainly feature the Yamaha GS-1 FM synthesizer, operated by Minoru Mukaiya. This synthesizer was subsequently used in many of their live-performances.

The European version of Mint Jams was released in the same year as the Japanese release. The following year, in 1983, when Casiopea visited London to record the album JIVE JIVE, a promotional live concert was held.

Track listing

Personnel 
Casiopea:
 Issei Noro – electric guitar  (YAMAHA SG-2000), arrangement
 Minoru Mukaiya – keyboards (YAMAHA GS-1, CS-70M, CP-35, Moog Source, ROLAND Vocoder Plus) 
 Tetsuo Sakurai – bass (YAMAHA BB-2000)
 Akira Jimbo – drums (YAMAHA YD-9000R), percussion

Production:
 Shunsuke Miyazumi – producer
 Satoshi Nakao – associate producer
 Norio Yoshizawa – engineer
 Atsushi Saito – assistant engineer
 Toshinao Tsukui – art director
 Masao Hiruma – illustration and design
 Kouji Suzuki – remastering engineer (2016 reissue)

Release history

External links

Full Live 
Aside from Casiopea Perfect Live II, all Casiopea lives officially released are cut. 

Some songs are missing from the official release, some are not in the right order and some are shorter. "Galactic Funk" was played with a special intro.

References 

1982 live albums
Casiopea live albums
Alfa Records live albums